Films from the South is an international movie festival held annually in Oslo, Norway. Movies from Africa, Asia, and Latin-America are shown. The festival has its origin in the student film club of University of Oslo, and has become one of Norway's most favourite festivals. It has approximately 20,000 visitors each year. The festival functions as a rendezvous to ethnic Norwegians and people with multicultural backgrounds.

The main award is the Silver Mirror for best feature film. Other awards include the audience award, the FIPRESCI-award and the DOK:SØR award for best documentary.

Awards

Silver Mirror
''Until 2003 known as 'The Oslo Films from the South Award'.

Other awards

References

Film festivals in Norway
Norwegian film awards
Festivals in Oslo